Angonyx kai is a moth of the  family Sphingidae. It is known from the Kai Archipelago in Indonesia.

References

kai
Moths described in 2006
Moths of Indonesia